Ihor Rakhayev (born 26 May 1973) is a Ukrainian professional football coach and a former player.

Career
From June 2011, he was an assistant coach with FC Metalist Kharkiv. And on 24 February 2014, after Myron Markevych's resignation he became the head coach of this club.

On 13 May 2017, Rakhayev left his position as manager of FC Aktobe.

In March 2020, he was appointed head coach of Moldovan "A" Division club FC Bălți. He left the club by mutual consent in December 2021.

References

External links 

1973 births
Living people
Footballers from Kharkiv
Soviet footballers
Ukrainian footballers
Ukrainian Premier League players
FC Torpedo Zaporizhzhia players
FC Metalist Kharkiv players
FC Arsenal Kharkiv players
Ukrainian football managers
Ukrainian Premier League managers
FC Arsenal Kharkiv managers
FC Metalist Kharkiv managers
CSF Bălți managers
Ukrainian expatriate football managers
Expatriate football managers in Moldova
Ukrainian expatriate sportspeople in Moldova
FC Aktobe managers
Expatriate football managers in Kazakhstan
Ukrainian expatriate sportspeople in Kazakhstan
FC Helios Kharkiv managers
Association football midfielders
Moldovan Super Liga managers